Fate of Norns is the fifth full-length studio album by the Swedish death metal band Amon Amarth. It was released on 6 September 2004 through Metal Blade Records. This album continued their slower, heavier sound which started on the previous album Versus the World. Before Fate of Norns was officially released by Metal Blade, promo copies were distributed with CD-ROM extras including pictures, biographies, sheets and logos. The album was released in conventional LP format as well as a limited digipak edition. The latter includes a live bonus DVD, Amon Amarth Live at Grand Rokk, which features live recordings and three-camera footage of a live performance in Reykjavík, Iceland on 5 March 2004. "The Pursuit of Vikings" was also made into a music video.

When asked to comment on the album, lead vocalist Johan Hegg, remarked:

Track listing
All songs written and composed by Amon Amarth.

Personnel

Band members
 Johan Hegg – vocals
 Olavi Mikkonen – lead guitar
 Johan Söderberg – rhythm guitar
 Ted Lundström – bass
 Fredrik Andersson – drums

Other
 Mixed and mastered at Berno Studio by Berno Paulsson
 Horn on "Arson" by Udo Schlangschnabel

References

Amon Amarth albums
Metal Blade Records albums
2004 albums